William Scott Cusack (born 23 May 1966) is a Scottish  judoka who represented Great Britain in the Olympics.

Early and personal life
Cusack was born in Glasgow, Great Britain. When he competed in the Olympics, he was 5-8.5 (175 cm) tall, and weighed 163 lbs (74 kg). He was married to 1982 U52 world champion judoka Loretta Doyle.

Judo career
Cusack was a six times champion of Great Britain, winning lightweight (lw) and half-middleweight (hmw) divisions at the British Judo Championships in 1988, 1990, 1991, 1992, 1993 (hmw) and 1994.

Cusack's sports club was Edinburgh. In 1990, he won the US Open Colorado Springs in the U71 weight class as well as the 1994 Scottish Senior Championships in the U78 weight class.

Cusack competed for Great Britain at the 1992 Summer Olympics in Barcelona, at the age of 26, in Judo--Men's Lightweight, and came in tied for 18th. He was awarded his 7th Dan on 29 October 2015 by the British Judo Association.

Coaching career
Cusack is Director of Coaching at Edinburgh Judo, and in 1999 was named UK Coach of the Year, receiving the Mussabini Medal.  He assisted Graeme Randall, who won the -81 kg world title in Birmingham.

References

1966 births
Living people
Scottish male judoka
Judoka at the 1992 Summer Olympics
Olympic judoka of Great Britain
Sportspeople from Glasgow
Commonwealth Games medallists in judo
Commonwealth Games bronze medallists for Scotland
Judoka at the 1990 Commonwealth Games
Medallists at the 1990 Commonwealth Games